Peter Thomas Primrose (born 26 September 1955) is an Australian politician.

He has been a Labor Party member of the New South Wales Legislative Council since 1996. He has served in various portfolios including Shadow Minister for Local Government, Shadow Minister for Regional Roads, Shadow Minister for Innovation and Better Regulation, Shadow Minister for Finance, Shadow Minister of State and Shadow Minister Assisting the Leader on Western Sydney. He was also the President of the Legislative Council (8 May 2007 – 17 November 2009), Minister for Disability Services (2 March 2010 – 28 March 2011) and Minister for Youth (8 December 2009 – 28 March 2011) among other portfolios.

Primrose was previously the Labor member for Camden in the Legislative Assembly from 1988 to 1991, and was unsuccessful in regaining the seat at the 1995 election.

After Primrose graduated from the University of Sydney with a Bachelor of Social Studies, he worked as a social worker with the Red Cross Welfare Service before working for the NSW Departments of Health, Youth and Community Services and as an adviser to the Commonwealth Minister for Consumer Affairs.
He served on Campbelltown City Council from 1980 to 1991, including a term as Mayor; and for five years as Chair of the Macarthur Health Services Board.

References

 

1955 births
Living people
Members of the New South Wales Legislative Council
Presidents of the New South Wales Legislative Council
Australian Labor Party members of the Parliament of New South Wales
21st-century Australian politicians